Eremites Friary was a friary in Bristol, England. The Brothers Eremites of St. Augustine kept a small convent near Temple Gate, founded by Sir Simon and Sir William Montacute in 1320. No trace of it remains today.

References 

Friaries in Bristol
Former buildings and structures in Bristol